Eric Robert Pearce (born 29 October 1931) is an Indian-born Australian former international field hockey player who represented Australia at four Olympic Games and numerous other international matches. He was born in Jabalpur, India. In his home state of Western Australia, he played as a striker for 19 years.

Playing career
Eric is one of five international-level hockey playing brothers, the others being Cec, Mel, Gordon and Julian. His daughter Colleen Pearce was part of the Australian national hockey team that came third at the 1983 World Cup and fourth at the 1984 Olympics. He is considered to be one of the finest field hockey players to have represented Australia.

Following the partition of India, his father Cec and elder brothers Cec and Mel settled in Perth, Western Australia in 1947. His mother Gladys, Eric and his two other brothers followed in the following year. The Anglo-Indian family had intended on settling in Victoria but instead chose to stay in Western Australia.

In the 1956 Olympics in Melbourne he joined with Gordon and Mel in the Australian team.  He also competed in 1960 Olympics in Rome, the 1964 Olympics in Tokyo (Australia's first Olympic hockey medal - bronze) and the 1968 Olympics in Mexico City (silver).  Eric was the Australian team flag-bearer at the 1968 Games.  In the 1964 Games he scored Australia's only two goals allowing his team to beat Pakistan (2-1) for the first time.  In the 1968 Games he scored all eight goals in one match against Japan (8-1), his biggest tally in an international match.

Pearce played in 12 national championships for Western Australia, winning seven, largely due to his own goal scoring abilities. He was inducted into the Sport Australia Hall of Fame as a founding member in 1985 - the only hockey player to have been selected.  He was inducted into the Western Australian Hall of Champions in 1986.

References

External links
 

1931 births
Living people
Australian male field hockey players
Anglo-Indian people
Australian people of Anglo-Indian descent
Australian sportspeople of Indian descent
Field hockey players at the 1956 Summer Olympics
Field hockey players at the 1960 Summer Olympics
Field hockey players at the 1964 Summer Olympics
Field hockey players at the 1968 Summer Olympics
Indian emigrants to Australia
Medalists at the 1968 Summer Olympics
Olympic field hockey players of Australia
Olympic medalists in field hockey
Olympic silver medalists for Australia
Olympic bronze medalists for Australia
People from Jabalpur
Sport Australia Hall of Fame inductees
Field hockey players from Madhya Pradesh
Field hockey players from Perth, Western Australia